Jiří Nouza is a former Czech cyclist. He competed for Czechoslovakia in three events at the 1956 Summer Olympics.

References

External links
 
 

Year of birth missing (living people)
Living people
Czech male cyclists
Olympic cyclists of Czechoslovakia
Cyclists at the 1956 Summer Olympics
Place of birth missing (living people)